Presidential elections were held in the Chechen Republic of Ichkeria, an unrecognized state considered a part of Russia under international law, on 27 January 1997. The result was a victory for Aslan Maskhadov.

Results

References

1997
1997 elections in Russia